Nathalie Sarles (born 17 April 1962) is a French nurse and politician of the Democratic Movement (MoDem) who served as a member of the National Assembly from 2017 to 2022., representing the 5th constituency of the department of Loire.

Political career
Sarles was previously a nurse before becoming a councillor for Villerest commune.

In parliament, Sarles served on the Sustainable Development, Spatial and Regional Planning Committee.

She lost her seat in the second round of the 2022 French legislative election to Antoine Vermorel-Marques.

Political positions
In 2020, Sarles went against the LREM parliamentary group's majority and abstained from an important vote on a much discussed security bill drafted by her colleagues Alice Thourot and Jean-Michel Fauvergue that helps, among other measures, curtail the filming of police forces.

References

1962 births
Living people
Deputies of the 15th National Assembly of the French Fifth Republic
Women members of the National Assembly (France)
Democratic Movement (France) politicians
21st-century French women politicians

People from Valence, Drôme